Ševětín Solar Park is the third-largest photovoltaic power plant in the Czech Republic, while also being one of the 50 largest photovoltaic power plants in the world. At , it generates electricity sufficient for 8,000 households.

See also

List of photovoltaic power stations

References 

Solar power stations in the Czech Republic
Buildings and structures in the Ústí nad Labem Region
České Budějovice District